Emmanuel Waine (born 6 October 1996) is a Papua New Guinean professional rugby league footballer who plays as a  and  for the London Broncos in the RFL Championship and Papua New Guinea at international level.

Career
Waine made his international debut for Papua New Guinea in their 24-14 victory over Fiji in the 2022 Pacific Test.

References

External links
PNG Hunters profile

1996 births
Living people
London Broncos players
Papua New Guinea Hunters players
Papua New Guinea national rugby league team players
Papua New Guinean rugby league players
Rugby league forwards